Jules Stordeur was a Belgian Olympic fencer. He competed in the team sabre event at the 1928 Summer Olympics.

References

External links
 

Year of birth missing
Possibly living people
Belgian male fencers
Belgian sabre fencers
Olympic fencers of Belgium
Fencers at the 1928 Summer Olympics